João André Ribeiro Vieira (born 19 December 1991) is a Portuguese footballer who plays for Torreense, as a forward.

Club career
Born in Leiria, Vieira joined  hometown União Leiria's youth system at the age of 8 where he completed his formation. He made his senior debuts in the Second Division at the third level of the league system, on loan to Atlético Reguengos in the 2010-11 season. In the 2011 summer he left União Leiria whiteout never appeared officially for its first team to spend two seasons at Marítimo B, the reserve team of Club Sport Marítimo.

The first season in the Second Division where he scored 7 goals in 19 Appearances. In the following campaign Vieira made his professional debut in a match against Leixões on 12 August 2012. He netted twice in the season's and his last match for the club  – in a 2–0 away win against Aves.

For 2013-14, Vieira joined Torreense in the Campeonato Nacional, the newly created third-tier football league in Portugal after the merging of the Segunda Divisão and Terceira Divisão. He started impressively and was netting four times in five matches. At the end of the 2013-14 he finished with a career-high 26 goals in 31 matches, and ended as 2013–14 top scorer.

On 5 June 2015, Vieira signed a three-year deal with top league club Moreirense.

On 27 June 2022, Vieira joined Torreense.

References

External links

Stats and profile at LPFP 

1991 births
People from Leiria
Sportspeople from Leiria District
Living people
Portuguese footballers
Association football forwards
Primeira Liga players
Liga Portugal 2 players
Campeonato de Portugal (league) players
Segunda Divisão players
U.D. Leiria players
C.S. Marítimo players
G.D. Chaves players
Moreirense F.C. players
C.D. Feirense players
F.C. Vizela players
U.D. Vilafranquense players
C.D. Cova da Piedade players
Casa Pia A.C. players
S.C.U. Torreense players